Lovejoy Township is one of twenty-six townships in Iroquois County, Illinois, USA.  As of the 2010 census, its population was 406 and it contained 184 housing units.  Lovejoy Township was formed from a portion of Milford Township on February 19, 1868.

Geography

Cities, towns, villages
 Wellington

Extinct towns
 Alonzo at 
 Hickman at

Cemeteries
The township contains these two cemeteries: Amity and Floral Hill.

Major highways
  Illinois Route 1

Demographics

School districts
 Hoopeston Area Community Unit School District 11

Political districts
 Illinois' 16th congressional district
 State House District 105
 State Senate District 53

References
 
 United States Census Bureau 2007 TIGER/Line Shapefiles
 United States National Atlas

External links
 City-Data.com
 Illinois State Archives

Townships in Iroquois County, Illinois
Townships in Illinois